Zacharias Blyhooft (or Zacharias Blijhooft; c. 1630 – 1681, Middelburg) was a Dutch painter, of whom but little is known; he lived in Middelburg from 1658/9 until his death in 1681, but probably learnt his trade elsewhere. Two pictures by him are noticed in the Catalogues of Hoet and Terwesten, and, in regard to their merit, compared to those of Netscher. For this reason he is noticed here, as many pictures are ascribed to Netscher that resemble his manner, but are not by him.

References
Blijhooft, Zacharias at the Netherlands Institute for Art History.

Attribution:

External link

1630 births
1681 deaths
Dutch Golden Age painters
Dutch male painters
Painters from Middelburg